Ismail Rashid Ismail is a UAE football defender who played for United Arab Emirates in the 1996 Asian Cup. He also played for Al Wasl FC

External links

1972 births
1992 AFC Asian Cup players
1996 AFC Asian Cup players
1997 FIFA Confederations Cup players
Emirati footballers
Living people
Al-Wasl F.C. players
UAE Pro League players
United Arab Emirates international footballers
Association football defenders
Footballers at the 1994 Asian Games
Asian Games competitors for the United Arab Emirates